Cerithium muscarum is a species of sea snail, a marine gastropod mollusk in the family Cerithiidae.

Distribution
The distribution of Cerithium muscarum includes the Western Central Atlantic.
 North America
 USA

Description 
The maximum recorded shell length is 26 mm.

Habitat 
Minimum recorded depth is 0 m. Maximum recorded depth is 18 m.

References

External links

Cerithiidae
Articles containing video clips
Gastropods described in 1832